Hold Back Tomorrow is a 1955 American film noir drama film directed by Hugo Haas and starring Cleo Moore and John Agar

Plot
A death row inmate has one final request before his impending hanging: he wants to spend the night with a woman. The police bring him a suicidal prostitute. After a night of lovemaking, the two are married by the prison chaplain. Just before going to the gallows, he describes a dream he had where the rope breaks during the hanging, the death bell rings, and he is freed. As he prays for his miracle the death bell tolls and the film fades to black.

Cast
 Cleo Moore as Dora
 John Agar as Joe Cardos
 Frank DeKova as Priest
 Dallas Boyd as Warden
 Steffi Sidney as Clara
 Mel Welles as First Guard
 Harry Guardino as Detective
 Mona Knox as Escort Girl
 Arlene Harris as Proprietress
 Kay Riehl as Warden's Wife
 Jan Englund as Girl
 Pat Goldin as Dancing Comedian

Production
This was the second film to costar Moore and Agar, who had appeared together in 1954's Bait, which was also directed by Hugo Haas.  Agar was a Universal contract player at the time of this film; Moore was on loan from Columbia Pictures.

See also
 List of American films of 1955

External links
 
 
 

1955 films
1955 drama films
Film noir
American black-and-white films
Films directed by Hugo Haas
American drama films
Universal Pictures films
Films about capital punishment
1950s English-language films
1950s American films